Season 2015–16 saw Greenock Morton compete in the Scottish Championship the second tier of Scottish football, having finished top of the Scottish League One in 2014-15. Morton also competed in the Challenge Cup, Scottish League Cup and the Scottish Cup.

Story of the season

May
After the conclusion to the 2014-15 season, manager Jim Duffy dedicated the title triumph to Greenock broadcaster Arthur Montford.

The first pre-season game of the season was announced as being an away fixture against BSC Glasgow, with Rotherham United visiting Cappielow for the third year in a row.

Jamie McCluskey was released, while Lee Kilday and Ricki Lamie were offered one-year contract extensions. Sean Crighton was also released along with Stefan Milojević, Aidan Ferris, Nicolas Caraux and Ross Caldwell. Jon Scullion also agreed a new contract with the club.

Brechin City winger Bobby Barr signed on a one-year deal. Joe McKee (one-year deal) and Jon Scullion (6-month contract) also re-sign.

Stefan McCluskey and Ross Forbes signed one-year contract extensions, as did Ricki Lamie, Michael Miller, Grant Adam and Derek Gaston. Thomas O'Ware also signed up on a one-year contract.

Andy Millen was appointed as Development squad manager to replace David Hopkin.

June
Warren Hawke was co-opted on to the club's board.

Celtic youth striker Luke Donnelly was announced as a loan target by manager Jim Duffy.

Four of Morton's U17 league winning side were offered full-time development contracts with the club; they were John Mitchell, Ruaridh Langan, Alex McWaters (all 17) and 16-year-old Scott Tiffoney.

Morton signed defender Frank McKeown from Stranraer. Young defender Craig Knight left the club by mutual consent on the same day.

When the fixtures were released on 19 June, Morton learned they would unfurl the Scottish League One championship flag against Falkirk on 8 August 2015.

Morton were given a home tie at home to Dumbarton in the first round of the Scottish Challenge Cup, when it was drawn on 29 June at St Mirren Park, Paisley.

July
Morton were drawn against Elgin City in the first round of the League Cup.

Frank McKeown and Peter MacDonald suffered minor injuries and were ruled out of most of pre-season.

Two of Morton's home games were selected by BBC Alba and BT Sport for live television coverage meaning they were moved to Friday (St Mirren) and Sunday (Rangers).

Morton's squad numbers were announced on 22 July, with new signings Frank McKeown and Bobby Barr getting numbers 5 and 16 respectively.

Ex-PSV Eindhoven youth player Romario Sabajo was offered a six-month deal, but fellow trialist Ricardo Talu would leave the club. He would sign the contract but would not be able to play against Dumbarton as the club were waiting on international clearance from the Dutch FA.

Morton tied up the signing of Birmingham City forward Denny Johnstone on a season-long loan.

Thomas O'Ware was ruled out for three weeks after going off injured at half time in the game against Dumbarton.

After scoring a brace as a trialist in a 3-0 win over Greenock Juniors, Chris Duggan would continue his trial for the foreseeable future according to manager Jim Duffy.

August
After defeating Elgin comfortably in the first round, Morton were drawn away to Queen of the South in round two of the League Cup.

After an injury to Frank McKeown, Morton brought in Canadian defender Luca Gasparotto on loan from Rangers until January 2016. The club also signed ex-Aberdeen youth Jai Quitongo on a free transfer for their development squad.

McKeown was ruled out for three months with extensive knee ligament damage.

Morton received international clearance to sign Romario Sabajo after a three-week hold up.

Queen of the South were defeated 1-0 to advance Morton to the third round of the League Cup, where they received a home tie against Motherwell.

September
Morton signed Swansea City striker Alex Samuel on loan until January.

In the third round of the Scottish League Cup, Motherwell were disposed of by three goals to two after extra-time. They were drawn against St Johnstone in the quarter-finals, for the second time in three years, to be played in late October.

October
The Renfrewshire derby with St Mirren was again chosen for coverage on BBC Alba, and moved forward to the Friday.

Mark Russell rejected an offer of a new contract, but stated that he would be willing to re-negotiate. However, Derek Gaston signed up for another two seasons until 2018.

Jordan Cairnie joined East Stirlingshire on an emergency loan until 6 January, whilst Cameron O'Neil was released by mutual consent.

Morton were eliminated from the Scottish League Cup by St Johnstone, by a scoreline of three goals to one.

Two days after the League Cup elimination, Morton were drawn away to Albion Rovers in the third round of the Scottish Cup.

November
After defeating Forfar in the third round, Morton were given a home tie against Ross County in the Little Big Shot Youth Cup.

Ricki Lamie ruled himself out for the whole of November with a hamstring tear.

Luca Gasparotto would be available to play against Queen of the South after he was not selected for Canada's matches against Honduras and El Salvador.

The development squad was eliminated from the Youth Cup by Ross County at Cappielow, with Thomas Orr scoring a second half consolation goal.

Morton would defeat Albion Rovers with goals from Denny Johnstone and Joe McKee to progress to the Scottish Cup fourth round.

December
Morton were drawn away from home against Livingston in the fourth round of the William Hill-sponsored Scottish Cup.

Another Morton fixture was moved for television purposes; Morton v Rangers which was due to be played on 23 January 2016 was moved back to the Monday night for BT Sport coverage.

Youth players Jai Quitongo and Lewis Strapp were rewarded for excellent form in the development squad with 18-month professional full-time contracts being offered. They would both accept the contract offers.

Jon Scullion was offered a contract extension until the end of the season, with the possibility of going out on loan.

With the end of his short-term contract approaching, Romario Sabajo will be allowed to return home after making few appearances for the first team.

Mark Russell signed a contract extension until the summer of 2017.

With the development league in its winter shutdown, captain Dylan Stevenson was loaned to Berwick Rangers for a month.

Morton brought last season's top scorer Declan McManus back to the club on loan from English side Fleetwood Town.

January

Grant Adam was released and signed for Cowdenbeath.

Matches against Hibernian were rescheduled to two midweek dates in February.

Alex Samuel's loan deal from Swansea City was extended until the end of the season.

Morton defeated Livingston to reach the fifth round of the Scottish Cup. Their reward was an away tie against Annan Athletic in the fifth round.

February 
Luca Gasparotto was ruled out for up to 10 weeks with an ankle injury.

After defeating Annan Athletic in the fifth round, Morton received another away draw in their first quarter-final since 1999; away to Celtic at Celtic Park.

Andrew McNeil signed on a short-term deal until the end of the season.

Alex Samuel returned to Swansea to receive treatment after sustaining an injury in a Development League West match against Queen's Park.

Morton's quarter-final match with Celtic was chosen for television coverage by Sky Sports.

Morton signed winger Paul McMullan on loan from Celtic.

Bobby Barr signed a pre-contract agreement on a two-year deal with league rivals Raith Rovers.

March
Morton were eliminated from the Scottish Cup by three first-half goals to nil at Celtic Park.

Declan McManus was named as SPFL Championship player of the month for February.

Michael Tidser's season was ruled to be over when he suffered a suspected hernia.

After a 19-game unbeaten run Morton won the Development League West win a 1-1 draw with nearest rivals Ayr United.

April
Cappielow's pitch was given a platinum status by the SPFL, as one of the top four pitches in the country along with Bayview Stadium, Tynecastle Stadium and Hampden Park.

Thomas O'Ware agreed a two-year contract extension, tying him to the club until 2018. Ross Forbes followed him in agreeing a two-year contract.

Morton released defenders Frank McKeown, Jordan Cairnie and Luke Irvine.

Manager Jim Duffy signed a new two-year deal after successfully keeping the team in the Championship and reaching two cup quarter-finals.

First team transfers
From end of 2014-15 season, to last match of season 2015-16

In

Out

Fixtures and results

Pre-season

Friendlies

Scottish Championship

Scottish Cup

Scottish League Cup

Scottish Challenge Cup

Development squad

Friendlies

Development League West

Scottish Youth Cup

League table

Player statistics

All competitions

Development squad goalscorers

Including goals from the Development League West (champions) and SFA Youth Cup

Thomas Orr - 14
Jon Scullion - 12
Alex McWaters - 11
Jai Quitongo - 9
Ruaridh Langan - 6
Scott Tiffoney - 4
Romario Sabajo - 2
Cameron O'Neil, Lewis Strapp, Luke Irvine, Ricki Lamie, John Tennent & Alex Samuel  - 1

Awards

Last updated 14 March 2016

References

Greenock Morton F.C. seasons
Greenock Morton